Sparrevohn LRRS Airport  is a military airstrip located south of Sparrevohn, in the Bethel Census Area of the U.S. state of Alaska. It is not open for public use.

Overview
Sparrevohn Airport is a United States Air Force military airstrip. Its mission is to provide access to the Sparrevohn Long Range Radar Site for servicing and other requirements.

The airstrip was constructed in 1952 as part of the construction of the Sparrevohn Air Force Station. During the station's operational use as a manned radar station, it provided transportation for station personnel and for supplies and equipment to be airlifted to the station. With the manned radar station's closure in 1983, the airstrip now provides access to the site for supply runs and to transfer crews.

It is staffed by five or fewer civilian contractors at any one time, and is not open to the public. During the winter months, it may be inaccessible due to the extreme weather conditions at the location.

Facilities and aircraft 
Sparrevohn LRRS has one runway designated 16/34 with a gravel surface measuring 4,198 by 151 feet (1,280 x 46 m). For the 12-month period ending July 17, 1978, the airport had 240 general aviation aircraft operations, an average of 20 per month.

References

External links 
 

Airports in the Bethel Census Area, Alaska
Military installations in Alaska